Tabiyet Jazira, alternatively rendered as at Tabiyah, al Tabiyeh, Al Tabiyyah, Al Tabiya or Al Tabiah, is a town in Deir ez-Zor District, Deir ez-Zor Governorate, Syria. According to the Syria Central Bureau of Statistics (CBS), Tabiyah had a population of 1,801 in the 2004 census. The Tabiya (Conoco) gas field and plant lie about 6 km to the north of the town.

See also 

 Battle of Khasham

References 

Populated places in Deir ez-Zor Governorate
Populated places on the Euphrates River